Five Women for the Killer  (originally titled 5 donne per l'assassino) is an Italian giallo film directed in 1974 by Stelvio Massi. Il Giorno wrote "the film has the merit of a quick direction that does not spare chills and twists".

Cast 
Francis Matthews: Giorgio Pisani
Pascale Rivalult: Dr. Lidia Franzi
Howard Ross: Commissioner
Giorgio Albertazzi: Aldo Betti
Katia Christine: Alba
Gabriella Lepori: Sofia 
Ilona Staller: Tiffany

References

External links

1974 films
Giallo films
1970s crime thriller films
1970s Italian films
Films directed by Stelvio Massi